David Shipman may refer to:

 David Shipman (colonist) (1730–1813), real-life inspiration for James Fenimore Cooper's character Natty Bumppo in the Leatherstocking Tales
 David Shipman (writer) (1932–1996), British film critic and writer